Now What?! is the 19th studio album by English rock band Deep Purple. It was released on 26 April 2013 and produced by Bob Ezrin. A dedicated official web site was also created by the band to post updates about the album. It was the band's first studio album in over seven years as Deep Purple's previous studio album, Rapture of the Deep, was released in late 2005.

On 26 February 2013, the album's title was announced. Additionally a new single featuring "Hell to Pay" and "All the Time in the World" was released in both CD and vinyl formats on 29 March 2013. On May 6, 2013, the band confirmed that a new single "Vincent Price" would be released on 7 June as download, CD single and 7" transparent vinyl. The single would also include the previously unreleased song "First Sign of Madness", two tracks from the now unavailable Rapture of the Deep limited edition and the track's video-clip.

The songs "Uncommon Man" and "Above and Beyond", which includes the lyrics "Souls having touched are forever entwined", are dedicated to founding member Jon Lord who died in July 2012. "Uncommon Man" is partly inspired by the classical composition "Fanfare for the Common Man", and features a synthesizer-generated fanfare theme composed by Don Airey.

Reception

Following its release, Now What?! was met with mostly positive reception from critics. AllMusic's Steve Leggett commented that the album sounded like a product of progressive metal's golden age, saying "Some things really shouldn't change, and Deep Purple recognize that. They haven't changed a bit and the group's many fans are going to find this release comforting in that regard". Sputnikmusic reviewer wrote that "fans of Purpendicular and the group’s last two albums will find several pleasing moments and the band should feel proud of the outcome too."

The album appeared at No. 104 on Sputnikmusic's list of the "Best Progressive Rock Albums of 2013."

Now What?! sold 4,000 copies in its first week in the US.

Six months after its release, Now What?! was certified gold in Germany (100 000 copies sold).

It was the first Deep Purple studio album to enter the UK top 40 albums charts since The Battle Rages On... in 1993.

Track listing

The Now What?! Live Tapes
This is Disc 2 of the November 2013 "Gold Edition Deluxe" double CD.

Personnel
Deep Purple
Ian Gillan – vocals
Steve Morse – guitars
Roger Glover – bass
Don Airey – keyboards
Ian Paice – drums, percussion

Additional musicians
Jason Roller – acoustic guitar ("All the Time in the World")
Eric Darken – percussion ("Bodyline", "All The Time in the World")
Mike Johnson – steel guitar ("All The Time in the World", "Vincent Price")
David Hamilton – additional keyboards ("Uncommon Man", "Weirdistan", "Above And Beyond")
Students of Nimbus School of Recording Arts – gang vocals ("Hell to Pay")
Bob Ezrin – additional backing vocals & percussion

Production
Bob Ezrin - producer, mixing
Justin Cortelyou - engineer, mixing
Li Xiao Le - assistant engineer
Zach Allan, Jarad Clement - additional engineers (The Tracking Room), 
Rob Harris, Mike Airey & Nathan Sage - additional engineers (Rainbow Recorders)
Greg Calbi - mastering at Sterling Sound, New York City

Charts

Weekly charts

Year-end charts

Certifications

Accolades

References

2013 albums
Deep Purple albums
Albums produced by Bob Ezrin
Edel AG albums